Prince Dmitry Ivanovich Svyatopolk-Mirsky (1825–1899) was an Imperial Russian Army general, a politician and a member of the princely Svyatopolk-Mirsky family.

Background 

Svyatopolk-Mirsky was born to the family of Tomasz Bogumił Jan Światopełk-Mirski, the ambassador to Russia from the semi-independent Kingdom of Poland. Dmitry's patronymic Ivanovich was based on a Russified form of the third name of his father. Despite being a member of a Polish szlachta, he was brought up in Saint Petersburg and considered himself Russian. The family's princely title was confirmed by the tsars when they relocated to Russia.

Career
He began his military service in 1841 in the Caucasian War, fighting against Chechens and Daghestanis. During the Crimean War, he took part in the battles in Kurukdere and Bayandur in Armenia. He commanded the Chernigov Infantry Regiment during the  Battle of Chernaya River, where he was seriously wounded. During the Crimean War, he became acquainted with the then junior officer Leo Tolstoy, with whom he had lifelong correspondence.

From 1857 to 1859, Svyatopolk-Mirsky commanded the Kabarda Regiment, took part in the storm of Gunib, and the capture of Imam Shamil. After the pacification of the Eastern Caucasus, he became the governor of the Terek Oblast, then the Governor-General of Kutaisi. In 1876, he became the deputy of the Viceroy of the Caucasus Grand Duke Mikhail Nikolayevich.

During the Russo-Turkish War, 1877-78, Svyatopolk-Mirsky was the chief of the General Staff of the Russian troops during the Battle of Kars. In 1880, he became a member of the State Council of Imperial Russia, and in 1884 he became the governor of the Kharkov Governorate.

He died in 1899 in Nice, France and was buried at the family estate, "Gievka," near Liubotyn in the former Kharkov Governorate.

Family

Sviatopolk-Mirsky and his wife, Georgian princess Sofia Orbeliani (daughter of Prince Iakob Orbeliani), had one son, Pyotr Dmitrievich Svyatopolk-Mirsky, future Minister of the Interior of Russia, and three daughters: Nina (1852-1926), Olga (? -1898) and Maria (1853-1889).

Nina, Olga and Maria each married prominent administrators of Imperial Russia: Woldemar von Daehn, Lord Sippola, Minister State Secretary of Finland; Prince Alexander Baryatinsky and Prince Ivan Makarovich Orbeliani, respectively. Olga was also a lady-in-waiting (before her marriage) and a lifelong friend to Empress Maria Fyodorovna, wife of Tsar Alexander III of Russia.

His younger brother, Nikolai Svyatopolk-Mirsky, was also a prominent general and politician.

Awards
1845  Cross of St. George
1848  Order of St Vladimir 4th degree
1849  Order of St. Anne, 3rd degree 
1854  Order of St. Anne, 2nd degree 
1856  Order of St George, 4th degree
1859  Order of St. Anne, 1st degree 
1860  Order of St Vladimir 3rd degree
1861  Order of St Vladimir 2nd degree
1866  Order of St. Alexander Nevsky
1863  Order of the White Eagle 
1877  Order of St George, 2nd degree
1879  Order of St Vladimir 1st degree
1895  Order of St. Andrew

External links
Biography

Military personnel of the Russian Empire
Russian politicians
Russian princes
Recipients of the Order of the White Eagle (Russia)
1825 births
1899 deaths
Military personnel from Saint Petersburg
Russian military personnel of the Crimean War
Members of the State Council (Russian Empire)
Recipients of the Cross of St. George
Recipients of the Order of St. George of the Second Degree